Hugh MacManaway MBE was Dean of Clogher from 1932 to 1950.

He was educated at Trinity College, Dublin and ordained in 1897.  After a curacy in Boho he held incumbencies at Aghalurcher, Lisbellaw, Errigal, Ballygawley and Enniskillen before his years as Dean.

References

Irish Anglicans
Alumni of Trinity College Dublin
Deans of Clogher
Members of the Order of the British Empire